The 2008 South American Rugby Championship "B"  will double as world cup qualifiers. It was the ninth edition of this competition

Standings
{| class="wikitable"
|-
!width=165|Team
!width=40|Played
!width=40|Won
!width=40|Drawn
!width=40|Lost
!width=40|For
!width=40|Against
!width=40|Difference
!width=40|BP
!width=40|Pts
|- bgcolor=#ccffcc align=center
|align=left| 
|4||4||0||0||169||20||+149||3||19
|- align=center
|align=left| 
|4||3||0||1||181||25||+156||3||15
|- align=center
|align=left| 
|4||2||0||2||86||123||−37||2||10
|- align=center
|align=left| 
|4||1||0||3||53||148||−95||0||4
|- align=center
|align=left| 
|4||0||0||4||23||196||−173||1||1
|}

Matches

2008
2008 rugby union tournaments for national teams
B
rugby union
rugby union
rugby union
rugby union
rugby union
International rugby union competitions hosted by Paraguay